Iranian Offshore Engineering and Construction Company (IOEC) is the first Iranian general contractor in the oil and gas industries. IOEC specializes in offshore EPC projects and is considered one of the regional pioneers in this area. The company was established in 1991 and operates mainly in the Persian Gulf, with its head office in Tehran. It experienced a very fast growth in its life and achieved a record of $7 billion for its ongoing projects in 2010.

IOEC designs, procures, constructs, installs and provides services for a complete range of offshore surface and partial subsurface infrastructure for the offshore oil and gas industries. IOEC is one of the largest integrated offshore and sub-sea pipe-laying companies in the Middle East. Iran is going to be self-sufficient in drilling of offshore wells up to certain depths (2009).

The company aims to extend its oil and gas activities in both onshore and offshore fields. In addition to mid-stream activities, IOEC intends to develop its up-stream operations. Development of the vessels and localizing the construction technology of drilling rigs include other objectives of this company. In 2016, IOEC stated that it will participate in projects in Europe and Africa.

See also
Petroleum industry in Iran
Industry of Iran

References

External links
 IOEC website

Construction and civil engineering companies of Iran
Oilfield services companies
Petroleum industry in Iran
Iranian entities subject to the U.S. Department of the Treasury sanctions